The City Nature Challenge is an annual, global, community science competition to document urban biodiversity. The challenge is a bioblitz that engages residents and visitors to find and document plants, animals, and other organisms living in urban areas. The goals are to engage the public in the collection of biodiversity data, with three awards each year for the cities that makes the most observations, find the most species, and engage the most people.

Participants primarily use the iNaturalist app and website to document their observations, though some areas use other platforms, such as Natusfera in Spain.   The observation period is followed by several days of identification and the final announcement of winners. Participants need not know how to identify the species; help is provided through iNaturalist's automated species identification feature as well as the community of users on iNaturalist, including professional scientists and expert naturalists.

History
The City Nature Challenge was founded by Alison Young and Rebecca Johnson of the California Academy of Sciences and Lila Higgins of the Natural History Museum of Los Angeles County. The first challenge was in the spring of 2016 between Los Angeles and San Francisco. Participants documented over 20,000 observations with the iNaturalist platform. In 2017, the challenge expanded to 16 cities across the United States and participants collected over 125,000 observations of wildlife in 5 days. In 2018, the challenge expanded to 68 cities across the world. In four days, over 441,000 observations of more than 18,000 species were observed, and over 17,000 people participated. The 2019 challenge more than doubled in scale, with almost a million observations of over 31,000 species observed by around 35,000 people.

Taking the competition beyond its US roots, the 2019 event was a much more international affair, with the winning city for observations and species coming from Africa (Cape Town), and three South American (La Paz, Tena and Quito) and two Asian areas (Hong Kong and Klang Valley) ranking in the top ten for number of observations.

In 2020, the organizers removed the competition aspect due to the COVID-19 pandemic, stating, "To ensure the safety and health of all participants, this year’s CNC is no longer a competition. Instead, we want to embrace the collaborative aspect of sharing observations online with a digital community, and celebrate the healing power of nature as people document their local biodiversity to the best of their ability." Fewer observations were documented in 2020 than the prior year, though more species were found and more cities and people participated.

2021 and 2022 each saw successive records in every category, but as in 2020, no winning cities were announced due to the COVID-19 pandemic.

Results

Notes

References

External links

 

Citizen science
Biological censuses
Biodiversity